Cameron Mason (born 18 August 2000) is a British cyclist, who currently competes in cyclo-cross, road racing and mountain bike racing for UCI team . His most notable achievement was coming 3rd in the under-23 men's race at the UEC European Cyclo-cross Championships in 's-Hertogenbosch, Netherlands in November 2020. He also runs a YouTube channel where he vlogs and gives his perspective on the races he competes in.

Major results

Cyclo-cross

2017–2018
 1st Overall Junior National Trophy Series
2nd Shrewsbury
3rd Derby
2018–2019
 National Trophy Series
3rd Shrewsbury
2019–2020
 3rd National Championships
2020–2021
 3rd  UEC European Under-23 Championships
2021–2022
 1st  National Under-23 Championships
 UCI Under-23 World Cup
1st Dendermonde
3rd Tábor
 National Trophy Series
1st Gravesend
 1st Clanfield
 2nd National Championships
 Under-23 X²O Badkamers Trophy
2nd Koppenberg
2nd Kortrijk
2nd Hamme
2022–2023
 1st  National Championships
 National Trophy Series
1st Falkirk

Mountain Bike

2018
 National Junior XC Series
1st Glentress Forest
 3rd Cross-country, National Junior Championships
2022
 2nd Overall National XC Series
2nd Tong
2nd Cannock Chase
3rd Fowey
 3rd Short track, National Championships

References

External links

Cameron Mason at Cyclocross24

Cyclo-cross cyclists
2000 births
Living people
British male cyclists
Scottish male cyclists
People from Linlithgow